The 1911 Detroit Heralds season was the seventh season of independent American football played by the Detroit Heralds. The team was coached by Bill Marshall, compiled a 4–0–1 record, and won the Detroit football championship. 

The team's lineup included Birtie Maher and R. Shields (ends), Polly La Grue (quarterback), Sylvester "Ole" Mauer and Schaffer (halfbacks), Lawrence Nedeau (fullback), and Hartledge (center). 

During the 1911 season, Birtie Maher was an 18-year-old immigrant from Ireland; he played 10 seasons with the Heralds, remaining with the team until the 1920 season when they played in the National Football League. 

Ole Mauer played with the Heralds starting in 1906. He was later remembered in a 1966 column by Joe Falls as "the first left halfback on the first professional football team to play in Detroit".

Schedule

Players
The team's players included the following, those players with at least three starts shown in bold:

 Beveridge - started 4 games at guard, 1 game at tackle
 Fair - started 1 game at guard
 Hartledge - started 4 games at center
 Jackel - started 4 games at tackle, 1 game at guard
 La Grue - started all 5 games at quarterback; also team captain
 Birtie Maher - started all 5 games at right end
 Mauer - started all 5 games at left halfback
 McGuire - started 1 game at center
 Nedeau - started 4 games at fullback
 Nichols - started 3 games at tackle, 1 game at fullback
 Schaffer - started all 5 games at right halfback
 G. Shields - started 4 games at guard, 1 game at tackle
 R. Shields - started all 5 games at left end
 Sullivan - started 1 game at tackle

References 

Detroit Heralds seasons
Detroit Heralds